is a Japanese footballer who plays as a right-back for J1 League club, Kawasaki Frontale.

Career statistics

Club
.

References

External links

2002 births
Living people
Association football people from Kyoto Prefecture
Japanese footballers
Japan youth international footballers
Association football defenders
Kawasaki Frontale players
JEF United Chiba players
J2 League players